The Benton Harbor Public Library (BHPL) is a public library located in Benton Harbor, Michigan. The BHPL service area consists of the City of Benton Harbor and Benton Charter Township, Michigan.

The library has an extensive reference department and book collection; an auditorium for group activities; and offers free wireless internet access.

BHPL is a member of the Southwestern Michigan Library Cooperative. BHPL also participates in the statewide MILibrary library card program.

History

The beginning

The first attempt to start a library in Benton Harbor took place in 1880, when an old Englishman named Alfred Coats decided the city needed a library. He made room for a collection of 200 books in his photographic studio, located above Hopkins' (later Peck's) Drug Store at the corner of Main and Water streets. A sign hung outside his studio proclaiming, "Alfred Coats, Librarian."

When Coats moved his studio, the books were moved to the office of well-known Twin Cities physician, H. V. Tutton (founder of Mercy Hospital). According to later newspaper accounts, interested people then decided the library related to schoolchildren, and so the collection moved to the office of the Superintendent of Schools. In 1892 when the new high school was built, the library was moved into it. The library came to an abrupt end when fire gutted the school in 1898.

New library building opened
The next attempt at forming a library actually started in 1898, when a group of ministers met and discussed the feasibility of starting a library for the "betterment of the community." They presented their request to the City Commission and on Jan. 2, 1899, the commission passed an ordinance creating the mechanism for establishing the library. In the spring of that year, the commission appropriated $1,500 for the public library.

In September 1900, the library opened in Room 12, located over a drug store at the corner of Pipestone and Main streets. Miss Louise Huntington Bailey was hired as the first librarian. Use of the library by children was so brisk, the city in 1901 hired Mrs. Emma Hinkley Cole as assistant librarian.

At about this time, the Carnegie Foundation was helping to establish public libraries throughout the United States as part of Andrew Carnegie's desire to upgrade education and the quality of life for the public. The library board secretary in 1902 solicited funds from the foundation, which eventually contributed $20,000 to build a public library building.

The fan-shaped building officially opened Aug. 4, 1903, with great fanfare. Fred Null's orchestra played and speeches were made. "The library is a dream in architectural beauty and a model in interior arrangement," according to a newspaper article recounting the affair. The new library was located at the foot of Brunson Hill, at the intersection of Sixth and Wall streets, opposite Bell's Opera House. One of the noted highlights of the building was that it had running water throughout. When it opened, the library had 3,500 books on the shelves.

Controversy and accidents

Even a decorous institution such as the public library has moments of controversy and excitement.

In 1923, head librarian Theodosia Falkingham "on behalf of the women patrons" requested that the city remove the park seats outside the library because that area had become "a paradise for tobacco spitting loafers and a convenient place for alcoholic imbibing gentry to sleep off their jags." Also, "painted ladies" plied their trade in the area. The city complied with the request and a citizen composed a poem about the event.

In 1924, Falkingham went before the City Commission to complain that the library only received $3,500 in financial support from the city, as opposed to $5,000 for the parks. She pointed out the library now had 9,000 books and a circulation of more than 60,000. This led to public approval of a millage to support the library.

In 1928, a Hupmobile sedan parked on Brunson Hill went amok. The brake released and the car plunged down the hill and through a basement window in the library. No one was in the car or the library at the time, but the car was found in a vertical position, rear end up, on the Children's Room floor.

It was "deja vu all over again" when a car again hit the building, and the flagpole, in 1951.

Expansion of service

The library responded to the community and the changing times over the years. A book drive for soldiers was conducted in 1942 to send books to soldiers serving in World War II. A book collection for "war time guidance" was created to help those on the home front deal with every day problems, such as rationing. Also that year, the library established a branch at Mercy Hospital to bring books and other materials to patients.

Benton Township in 1963 contracted with the city for library service, discontinuing its own small library and arranging for bookmobile service. Then plans were made in the early and mid-1960s to build a new library building. Construction began in 1966 during the tenure of Library Director Eleanor Whitney, and the new building was dedicated in 1968. A feature of the new library was a 2.5-ton statue depicting the mythological Icarus, which was donated by the Arthur Sidney Mendel Foundation. The statue was put in place while construction was going on, and the building was finished around it. The statue was rededicated in 1991 to honor longtime board member Dave Goldbaum, who served on the board from 1952 until his death in 1990.

One casualty did occur—a wall of the old library collapsed during construction, forcing some of the library services to move into the old News Palladium building on Wall Street. The old library eventually was demolished, a victim of "urban renewal."

A new era of library service began with the move to the new building. A new bookmobile was purchased in 1978. A high-tech microfilm reader-printer was given to the library by the B'nai B'rith Lodge in 1970. Several neighborhood libraries were established under the Model Cities Program (no longer in existence). Art work was added to the circulating collection. The Israelite House of David research room was opened. The library offered rental of videodiscs, and later videotapes. A computer terminal with internet access was made available to the public in 1997. That same year, the Benton Harbor Lions Club Foundation paid for half of a new $14,000 microfilm reader printer.

Court case

In a significant move in 1979, the library board filed suit against the city in Berrien County Circuit Court. At issue was the question of who had authority over the library, the city or the library board. Circuit Court Judge Zoe Burkholz ruled in favor of the library board, a decision which was upheld by the state Court of Appeals in 1980.

See also

Benton Harbor, Michigan
Benton Charter Township, Michigan

External links
Benton Harbor Public Library Official Website
The City of Benton Harbor, Michigan Website
Southwestern Michigan Library Cooperative
The Library of Michigan's Official MichiCard Page

Library buildings completed in 1903
Public libraries in Michigan
Education in Berrien County, Michigan
Buildings and structures in Berrien County, Michigan
Benton Harbor, Michigan